Rodney T. Berry (March 6, 1948 – March 31, 2013) was an American politician and lawyer.

Born in Fairmont, West Virginia, Berry graduated from Union High School in Benwood, West Virginia, in 1966. He then received his bachelor's degree from West Liberty University in 1970 and then received his Juris Doctor degree from West Virginia University College of Law in 1973. He practiced law in Moundsville, West Virginia and was a lobbyist. He served in the West Virginia House of Delegates in 1987–1991. He died in Wheeling, West Virginia.

Notes

1948 births
2013 deaths
20th-century American lawyers
Lawyers from Fairmont, West Virginia
West Liberty University alumni
West Virginia University College of Law alumni
Politicians from Fairmont, West Virginia
Members of the West Virginia House of Delegates
People from Moundsville, West Virginia
West Virginia lawyers